Roy and HG's Russian Revolution was a sports/comedy talk show, broadcast every night during the Sochi 2014 Olympics, presented by Australian comedy duo Roy and HG.

Targets of humour included Vladimir Putin, "useful" Russian phrases, New Zealand, the public toilets in the Olympic Park and Russian pop and folk music. Roy and HG also provided commentary for several events, parodying the pressure commentators put on athletes, with HG getting extremely upset when Australian athletes were beaten, and Roy being extremely critical of them for under-performing.

References

Australian comedy television series
Olympics on Australian television
Network 10 original programming
10 Bold original programming
2014 Australian television series debuts
2014 Australian television series endings
2014 Winter Olympics
Australian sports television series